Elections to Wigan Council were held on 6 May 1999. One-third of the council was up for election. Prior to the election, the Liberal Democrats had gained the seat being fought in Beech Hill from Labour in a by-election, and long-time Labour councillor for Atherton, Jack Sumner, had defected to independent.

All wards were fought for the first time since 1992, and the election boasted the highest number of candidates excepting the all-out elections of 1973 and 1980. The increase came from the Green Party standing a full-slate, seemingly energised by their third place the previous year, with both Labour and the Conservatives repeating their recent contesting rates. The Lib Dem's showing of six candidates, conversely, resembled a party resigned to fourth place. Elsewhere the aforementioned Independent was fighting Leigh East, and an incumbent Independent Labour candidate sought her fourth term in Hindley.

The previous year had brought about the worst turnout recorded, and this election did little to improve upon it, increasing by just one percent to 18.4%. The general picture too was one of little difference to the preceding election. All three main parties managed to improve their vote upon the previous year's historic lows, but none were able to in a significant manner, and as such, their figures remained at historically poor levels. The party shares were also little changed, with a modest recovery of the Lib Dems and the Greens achieving a new peak mainly at the expense of Labour.

Labour, however, made a net gain as they retook their seat in Beech Hill from last year's by-election victors the Lib Dems, and finally ousted the Independent Labour who'd held her seat in Hindley for more than a decade. Their solitary loss was a shock defeat in their previously safe seat of Hindsford, as the Lib Dems surged on a 21.6% swing to displace Samuel Little from the council – whose incumbency had been uninterrupted in the 25-year-long history of the council up to that point. The comparable record of the independent was ended as he made little progress in Leigh East and the Greens looked no more competitive than the previous year – and actually less in certain areas.

Election result

This result had the following consequences for the total number of seats on the Council after the elections:

Ward results

By-elections between 1999 and 2000

References

1999 English local elections
1999
1990s in Greater Manchester